Gattuso is an Italian surname. Notable people with the surname include:

 Gennaro Gattuso (born 1978), football manager and former player
 Consolato Gattuso (born 1967), Physicist Fermi Lab 
 Greg Gattuso (born 1962), football coach
 James Gattuso (born 1957), research fellow
 Jean-Pierre Gattuso (born 1958), ocean scientist
 Sébastien Gattuso (born 1971), athlete 
 Stefano Gattuso (born 1984), racing driver
 Dj Gattuso, electronic dance musician

Italian-language surnames